Diabolus in Musica (Latin for "The Devil in Music") is the eighth studio album by American thrash metal band Slayer, released on June 9, 1998, by American Recordings. Guitarist Jeff Hanneman wrote most of the album's content, which has been described as Slayer's most experimental. It was the band's first album to be played mostly in C tuning, and named after a musical interval known for its dissonance. Lyrical themes explored on the album include religion, sex, cultural deviance, death, insanity, war, and homicide.

Despite receiving mixed reviews from critics, Diabolus in Musica peaked at number 31 on the Billboard 200, selling over 46,000 copies in its first week of sales. By 2009, it had sold over 306,000 copies in the United States.

Writing, music, and recording
Paul Bostaph returned to Slayer in early 1997 after his short-lived side project The Truth About Seafood, and the band entered the recording studio a few months later. Diabolus in Musica was recorded at Ocean Way Recording, and complete by September 1997. It was scheduled to be released the following month, but got delayed until the middle of 1998, after American Recordings was taken over by Columbia Records.

Slayer guitarist Jeff Hanneman described the writing process as, "When we were writing this album I was looking for something to beat; I wanted something to beat, but nothing impresses me right now. Nothing sounded really aggressive or heavy enough to inspire me to beat it, so I just had to come up with my own shit."

Adrien Begrand of PopMatters felt Slayer introduced characteristics to its music including tuned down guitars, murky chord structures, and churning beats. He believed these characteristics were adopted in response to the then-burgeoning nu metal scene. Drummer Paul Bostaph claims the album is his favorite as he thought the album was "as experimental as Slayer got". As a result, Diabolus in Musica was described as nu metal, and has also been described as groove metal and alternative metal.

Album title and lyrical themes

Diabolus in Musica is a Latin term for "The Devil in Music" or tritone. Medieval musical rules did not allow this particular dissonance. According to one mythology, the interval was considered sexual and would bring out the devil; Slayer vocalist and bassist Tom Araya jokingly said that people were executed for writing and using the interval.

Araya held concern about the lyrics that King penned to "In the Name of God", voicing his opinion to guitarist Hanneman. King's viewpoint was; "It's like, 'C'mon, man, you're in Slayer. You're the antichrist — you said it yourself on the first album!' You can't draw the line like that. Whether he agrees with it or not, he didn't write it — I wrote it. So you have to say, 'Well, it's just a part of being in this band.' Now Jeff and I, we don't give a fuck. If Jeff wrote something I had a problem with, I would never even raise a fucking finger. I'd be like, 'Fuck yeah, let's do it! Gonna piss someone off? Alright!'"

Touring and promotion
Following the release of the album, the band commenced the Diabolus in Musica tour. From 1998 to 1999, Slayer toured with Sepultura, System of a Down, Fear Factory, Kilgore, Clutch, Meshuggah, and Sick of It All. Slayer released a promotional 3-track album called Diabolus in Musica Tour Sampler. The album features 3 tracks, one from Diabolus in Musica ("Stain of Mind"), "Ship of Gold" off tourmate Clutch's The Elephant Riders and "Suite-Pee" (Clean Version) from the debut album by System of a Down.

Reception

Diabolus in Musica was released on June 9, 1998, by American Recordings. In its first week of release, the album sold 46,000 copies in the United States, and debuted at number 31 on the Billboard 200.
By November 2009, it had sold over 306,000 copies in the US.

Reviewing the 2003 Slayer box set Soundtrack to the Apocalypse, Adrien Begrand of PopMatters called Diabolus in Musica "a unique record [...] It's as if they're stepping in to show the young bands how to do it right, as songs like 'Bitter Peace', 'Death's Head', and the terrific 'Stain of Mind' blow away anything that young pretenders have put out." Writing in The Guardian, journalist Joel McIver said although the album was as musically heavy and lyrically dark as any of Slayer's previous releases, it exhibited the groove-based style of the then-popular nu metal sound.

However, not all reviews were positive. Reviewing a Slayer concert at Irving Plaza during the Diabolus in Musica tour, Ben Ratliff of The New York Times''' panned the album for its murky production, saying: "Eight of the 11 songs on Diabolus in Musica, a few of which were played at the show, are in the same gray key, and the band's rhythmic ideas have a wearying sameness too." Reviewing Slayer's 2001 album God Hates Us All, Blabbermouth.net reviewer Borivoj Krgin described Diabolus in Musica as "a feeble attempt at incorporating updated elements into the group's sound, the presence of which elevated the band's efforts somewhat and offered hope that Slayer could refrain from endlessly rehashing their previous material for their future output." Sarah Vowell of Spin gave the album a four out of ten rating, stating that "Fifteen years into Slayer's career, they're still deploying the same fast beats and sluggish riffs and batty banter." concluding that "This is loudness without fun, blasphemy without subversion, darkness with no shades of gray. The drums are miked really well, though."

Songs from the album were rarely played live following the return of drummer Dave Lombardo in 2002, with "Stain of Mind" being the only constant.

Band members' views
Kerry King has expressed regret for the musical direction of Diabolus in Musica. In the "Nu Metal" episode of the 2011 VH1 documentary series Metal Evolution'', he said the following in retrospect about the album:

Track listing

Personnel

Slayer
 Tom Araya – bass, vocals
 Kerry King – guitars
 Jeff Hanneman – guitars
 Paul Bostaph – drums

Technical personnel
 Rick Rubin – producer
 Howie Weinberg – mastering
 Greg Gordon – engineer
 Brian Davis – assistant engineer
 John Tyree – assistant engineer
 Sebastian Haimerl – assistant engineer
 Allen Sanderson – assistant engineer
 Exum – photography
 Frank – art direction
 Wade Goeke – assistant engineer

Charts

References

Slayer albums
1998 albums
Albums produced by Rick Rubin
American Recordings (record label) albums
Nu metal albums by American artists
Groove metal albums
Alternative metal albums by American artists